Guns a Poppin! is a 1957 short subject directed by Jules White starring American slapstick comedy team The Three Stooges (Moe Howard, Larry Fine and Joe Besser). It is the 179th entry in the series released by Columbia Pictures starring the comedians, who released 190 shorts for the studio between 1934 and 1959.

Plot
Moe is on trial for assaulting Larry and Joe. Moe appeals to the judge (Vernon Dent), claiming he is a sick man who was instructed by his doctor to maintain peace and quiet. This peace is broken by Larry and Joe who are loudly rehearsing their "The Original Two-Man Quartet" routine to serenade Moe. Moe cracks, and wraps Larry's trombone slides around the quartet's neck. Realizing Moe is in bad shape, Larry and Joe decide to take their ailing leader on a hunting trip to relieve his stress. Moe takes to the idea like ducks to bread, and the Stooges start packing.

No sooner do they arrive in an empty cabin when a hungry bear devours some eggs and potatoes while Moe has his back turned. His nerves double frayed, Moe asks Larry and Joe to pursue the bear. One thing leads to another, and the bear ends up behind the wheel of the Stooges' car, driving away with it. Then, when Moe thinks he is at the end of his rope, the Stooges get involved with a sheriff (Frank Sully) in hot pursuit of outlaw Mad Bill Hookup (Joe Palma). The Stooges unwittingly capture Hookup and earn a $10,000.00 reward but then stupidly let Hookup escape and now the sheriff has to go out and capture him all over again; Now mad and furious Moe attacks Larry and Joe with a cutting axe.

Back in the courtroom, Moe ends his story by concluding that he must go back to bed for six additional months. The judge takes pity on the poor Stooge, and finds him not guilty. Joe and Larry are disgusted by the ruling and are about to get theirs. But thanks to Larry's tough skull the axe is now broken and Moe begins to lose his nerves again.

Cast
 Moe Howard as Moe
 Larry Fine as Larry
 Joe Besser as Joe
 Vernon Dent as Judge
 Joe Palma as Mad Bill Hookup
 Frank Sully as Sheriff
 Johnny Kascier as Courtroom Spectator (uncredited)
 Paul Kruger as Bailiff (stock footage and uncredited)

Production notes
Guns a Poppin! is a remake of 1945's Idiots Deluxe, using a surprisingly minimal amount of stock footage from the original. All new scenes were filmed on November 28, 1956.

See also
 List of American films of 1957

References

External links
 
 
Guns a Poppin! at threestooges.net

1957 films
1957 comedy films
American black-and-white films
The Three Stooges film remakes
Films directed by Jules White
The Three Stooges films
Columbia Pictures short films
1950s English-language films
1950s American films